Charles David Stewart (born 20 May 1958) is a Northern Irish former professional footballer who played as a left winger.

Career
Born in Belfast, Stewart played  for Bangor, Hull City, Chelsea, Scunthorpe United, Bridlington Trinity, Goole Town, Hartlepool United and Grantham. He also earned one cap for the Northern Ireland national team.

References

1958 births
Living people
Association footballers from Northern Ireland
Northern Ireland international footballers
Bangor F.C. players
Hull City A.F.C. players
Chelsea F.C. players
Scunthorpe United F.C. players
Bridlington Trinity F.C. players
Goole Town F.C. players
Hartlepool United F.C. players
Grantham Town F.C. players
English Football League players
Association football wingers
Expatriate association footballers from Northern Ireland
Expatriate footballers in England